The 2006 Amstel Gold Race was the 41st edition of the road bicycle race "Amstel Gold Race", held on April 16, 2006, in the Dutch province of Limburg. The race stretched 253.1 kilometres with start in Maastricht and finish in Valkenburg.

General standings

External links
Race website
Race map

Amstel Gold Race
2006 UCI ProTour
2006 in Dutch sport